Jake Scrimshaw (born 13 September 2000) is an English professional footballer who plays for  club Eastleigh, as a striker.

Early and personal life
Scrimshaw was born on the Isle of Wight, growing up in Ryde. He attended Ryde Academy.

Career
Scrimshaw began his career at AFC Bournemouth, joining them at the age of 15 following a trial with the club. He spent the 2018–19 season on loan at Poole Town, scoring 17 goals in 23 games in all competitions for the club. Following the loan spell he was praised by the club's manager, and turned professional with Bournemouth in June 2019.

He moved on loan to Eastleigh in January 2020, making 10 appearances in all competitions, and signed a new two-year contract with Bournemouth in July 2020.

He signed on loan for Walsall in October 2020.

On 8 January 2021, Scrimshaw joined Newport County on loan until the end of the season. He made his debut for Newport in the starting line up for the 0–0 draw against Salford City in League Two on 16 January 2021. Scrimshaw scored his first goal for Newport on 23 January 2021 in the 3-2 League Two defeat against Oldham Athletic.

On 20 August 2021, Scrimshaw again returned to League Two on loan, this time joining Scunthorpe United for the duration of the 2021–22 season.

On 26 August 2022, Scrimshaw joined National League side Yeovil Town, signing a two-year deal. On 6 January 2023, Scrimshaw left Yeovil via mutual consent having played eight times.

On 21 February 2023, Scrimshaw signed for National League side Eastleigh on a short-term deal.

Career statistics

References

2000 births
Living people
People from the Isle of Wight
English footballers
AFC Bournemouth players
Poole Town F.C. players
Eastleigh F.C. players
Walsall F.C. players
Newport County A.F.C. players
Scunthorpe United F.C. players
Yeovil Town F.C. players
Southern Football League players
National League (English football) players
English Football League players
Association football forwards